10000 Years Later is a 2015 Chinese animated epic action fantasy film directed by Yi Li. It was released on March 27, 2015.

Synopsis
This story takes place in the far future after a cataclysmic event that forces humanity to revert to a medieval-style civilization. Wugreb, the leader of a Tibetan tribe called the Wu Tribe, led an expedition to the Western Regions of China to rediscover an ancient city called Tech City, which their ancestors created at the acme of their civilization. Wugreb, however, became drunk with the new-found technology he recovered from Tech City, and uses it to create a vast army of monsters and demons to conquer the world, starting with the Western Regions.

His plans for global domination were thwarted, however, by the guardian goddess of Tibet, Kelsang. Wugreb is then imprisoned within the tomb of Kuger for a thousand years. The effects of Wugreb's onslaught are evident around the world. Many new creatures and even new human species rise up because of Tech City's return to the world. The seal placed by Kelsang, holding Wugreb in his prison, begins to wane in power. It's up to a young storyteller and her warrior comrades from around the world to rise up and stand against the invasion of Wugreb and the return of Tech City.

Cast

Joma 珠玛
Yalayam 亚拉亚姆
Yi Li 易立
Wang Chong 王翀
Wang Lu 王鲁
Zhou Ting 
Zhong Guilin 
Teng Mengqiao 
Liu Yong 
Nie Shengjie 
Liu Pingping 
Jia Lu 
Deng Haiying 
Wang Yi 
Xia Shuoming 
Lu Xiaofei 
Chen Jingxing 
Li Fei 
Li Siru

Reception
The film earned  at the Chinese box office.

References

External links

2015 animated films
2015 films
Chinese animated fantasy films
Chinese animated films
2010s fantasy action films